The Zanzibar International Film Festival (ZIFF), also known as Festival of the Dhow Countries, is an annual film festival held in Zanzibar, Tanzania and one of the largest cultural events in East Africa. ZIFF is a non-governmental organization established in 1997 to develop and promote film and other cultural industries as catalyst for the regional social and economic growth.

The film festival

The annual multi disciplinary arts and cultural festival is ZIFF’s major activity; the festival is an all-arts affair, with 8 days of local and international discussion panels, workshops, 10 days of screenings of the best local and international cinema and evenings of musical concerts including a Gala each evening. All festival programs are a culmination of the realization of the capacity of film to fuse together the best of each art-form, offering a wide range of Entertainment, Educating and Networking options for world audiences.

The festival is arguably the largest multi disciplinary art and cultural festival in Africa, and continues to lead as a tourist attraction event in the region. ZIFF now gives 12 International Awards presented by 5 International Juries. It is estimated that 7000 western tourists came to Zanzibar to attend the festival and the total festival audience was in excess of 100,000 with wide appeal across race, class and religions. Its impact on the economy of Zanzibar is unquestionable.

The ZIFF festival now runs 15 programs over the 10 days that include:
Film Competition
Film Workshops
Opening and Closing Nights
Film Outreach Projections
Women panorama
Children panorama
Village panorama
Festival of Festivals
Soko Film
Art and Exhibition
Children Film panorama
UNICEF Life skills Camps
Children Peace camps
Difficult Dialogues
Historical and Cultural Village Tours
During the festival, films are shown in Stone Town in Zanzibar City, as well as rural Zanzibari villages.

Awards
Golden Dhow
Silver Dhow
Documentary
Short/Animation
East Africa Talent
ZIFF Jury Award
UNICEF Award
ZIFF Life Time Achievement Award
ZIFF Chairman Award
Sembene Ousmane Award
Signis Award
East Africa Region Talent
Signis Jury Award — Commendation
Verona Award

Golden Dhow winners

References

External links

Film festivals in Tanzania
Tourist attractions in Zanzibar
Film festivals established in 1997
1997 establishments in Tanzania